Lise Nordin (born 20 October 1982) is a Swedish politician and member of the Riksdag for the Swedish Green Party (Miljöpartiet). She is spokesperson for the party regarding energy politics since 2010.

External links
Miljöpartiet de Gröna - Lise Nordin

Living people
1982 births
Members of the Riksdag from the Green Party
Place of birth missing (living people)
21st-century Swedish women politicians